Bernard Ryan (December 2, 1923 - January 3, 2020) was an American writer. His works include The Poodle at the Poodle and Tyler's Titanic.<ref>Carson, Michael J. The Midwest Book Review'''s, July 2009</ref>Booklist, October 1, 2002 His biography of Senator Hillary Clinton was a New York Times notable book for young adults in 2004.  Ryan was a regular contributor to Advertising Age, Air & Space Smithsonian, American Way, Atlantic Flyer, Boys' Life, Country Home,  Notre Dame Magazine, Parents, Private Pilot, and Your Money.

Early life
A native of Albion, New York, Ryan graduated from the Rectory School in 1938, Kent School in 1942, and from Princeton University in February 1945 as a member of the Class of 1946.

BooksSix to Five Against: A MiscellanyA Boy at The Four Corners: Looking into Small-town America in Its PrimeThe Poodle at The PoodleLaw Enforcement Agencies: The Secret Service (2010)Tyler's TitanicThe Wright Brothers: Inventors of the Airplane (YA)The Poisoned Life of Mrs. MaybrickHillary Rodham Clinton: First Lady and Senator (YA) Jeff Bezos: Business Executive and Founder of Amazon.com (YA)Stephen Hawking: Physicist & Cosmologist (YA)Warren Buffett: Capitalist (YA)Jimmy Carter: U.S. President (YA)Condoleezza Rice: Secretary of State (YA)Simple Ways to Help Your Kids Become Dollar-SmartHelping Your Child Start SchoolTeenage VolunteeringCommunity Service for Teens (8 volumes)Great American TrialsGreat World TrialsSex, Sin and Mayhem: Notorious Trials of the Nineties''

References

External links
 About Ryan Bernard Jr.

20th-century American novelists
American male novelists
Kent School alumni
2020 deaths
20th-century American male writers
1923 births